St. Thomas' Episcopal Church is a congregation of the Diocese of Fond du Lac located in Menasha, Wisconsin. The congregation has 900 baptized members and an average Sunday worshipping attendance of 250. It is part of the Lake Winnebago Deanery.

The church's 1963 building was designed by Harry Weese.

History
The roots of the congregation begin in 1853 with services held in the Menasha area. In 1859, St. Stephen's was organized. In 1866, the roots of a new congregation were planted and in 1868, Trinity Church was organized in Neenah.

Over the next 50 years, these congregations in the "Twin Cities" were usually served by the same priest. Often when one congregation was healthy and vital, the other would struggle. This position reversed many times over five decades. In early 1914 discussion about uniting these two congregations into one began in earnest.

On Christmas Day, 1914, the first union service was held and on Easter Day, 1915 a new congregation was formally established. Junior Warden Harry Price, who had worshipped in St. Thomas Church Fifth Avenue, New York, persuaded the Vestry to name the new congregation after it because of its beauty. St. Thomas was formally incorporated on September 8, 1915.

Over the next 90+ years, the congregation experienced growth in membership, programs and property. A new church building was occupied in 1916. Boy Scout Troop 3 was founded in 1922. Stained glass windows were installed in the 1930s. By the 1940s, baptized membership exceeded 500 from over 200 families. A new Parish Hall replaced the Parish House and Gymnasium in the 1950s.

The 1970s saw development of strong lay leadership in the congregation and community. The 1980s experienced personal and corporate spiritual renewal and a strong healing ministry. The 1990s and 2000s saw development of team ministries and outreach programs.

Architecture

In 1961, fire destroyed the west 1/3 of the church building. By 1963, a new 'addition' by Chicago architect Harry Weese was dedicated which integrated the old sanctuary and nave as a chapel to a modern sanctuary and nave of concrete, wood and copper.  it is regarded as among Weese's most "noteworthy" buildings.  Architecture critic Ian Baldwin calls St. Thomas Episcopal, an example of "Weese’s most poetic work," writing that "It seems to match the best work of Marcel Breuer, who at the same time was also building spare, dramatic Béton brut churches in the upper Midwest."

Ministries
Formation and children's ministries have always been a vital part of the congregation. Mission and outreach ministries have been present throughout the history of the congregation. Double Portion, a feeding program, is a part of St. Thomas serving 100 guests a lunch each week. There is also a food pantry.

Clergy
The current Rector is the Rev. Ralph Osborne, who has served since 2010.

These are the clergy who have served at St. Thomas.
Rectors:
 Hebert A. Wilson 1915–1917 
 William G. Studwell 1917–1920 
 Raymond A. Heron 1920–1925 
 Gordon A. Fowles 1926–1932 
 Malcom VanZandt 1932–1936 
 Leonard Mitchell (Interim) 1936 
 Albert A. Chambers [became Bishop of Springfield] 1936–1942 
 Herman A. Berngen 1942–1944 
 Crawford W. Brown (Interim) 1944 
 John Bartel Reinheimer 1945–1955 
 Thomas K. Chafee 1956–1975 
 William Johnston 1976–1997 
 Ian Montgomery 1997–2009 
 Ed Smith (Interim) 2009–2010 
 Ralph Oshborne 2010–

Other Clergy:
Aran Walter, Associate Priest 2013
Lisa Ueda, Deacon 2020
Rodger Patience, Deacon 2010–2016
Bob Frees, Deacon 2002–2007 
Ed Smith, Associate  2000's 
Vicki Natzke, Assistant 2000's 
Lon Pearson, Assistant 1990's 
Wayne Bulloch, Assistant 1980's 
David Fine, Assistant 1970's

References

Sources

External links
Website of St. Thomas, Menasha
Double Portion

Churches in Outagamie County, Wisconsin
Menasha
Christian organizations established in 1915
Churches completed in 1916
Harry Weese buildings
Churches completed in 1963
Modernist architecture in Wisconsin
1853 establishments in Wisconsin